Tetiana Heorhiyivna Ostrikova (born 22 January 1979) is a Ukrainian politician and lawyer. She is a for member of parliament of Ukraine of the 8th convocation. Member of the parliamentary faction Samopomich Union. Member of the Intra-faction Deputies Union 'Deputy Control' and the Ukraine National Association of Lawyers.

Biography
Tetiana Ostrikova was born in Rivne, Ukraine. She attended school No. 15 with specialisation in English, which she graduated in 1996. In 1996–1997 Ostrikova was studying at the Preparation department at the University of Ljubljana (Slovenia). In 1997–2002 she studied at the National University of Kyiv Mohyla Academy, where she obtained the Specialist degree in Law. In 2002–2007 she was working as Assistant professor and then Professor at the Department of Sectoral Law Studies, Faculty of Law at the National University of Kyiv Mohyla Academy.

In 2003–2009 she has been working as lawyer at Investment-Consulting Company Universal-Contact, Attorney Union Volkov and Partners. Since 2009 was the head of Unico-Estate, a real estate company. Ostrikova is married and a mother to two sons.

Ostrikova is a co-hosts on the talk show "By and large" on "24 Channel".

Ostrikova again took part in the July 2019 Ukrainian parliamentary election for Self Reliance on its national election list. But in the election the party won 1 seat (in one of the electoral constituencies) while only scoring 0.62% of the national (election list) vote.

References

1979 births
Living people
Politicians from Rivne
21st-century Ukrainian lawyers
National University of Kyiv-Mohyla Academy alumni
University of Ljubljana alumni
Ukrainian women lawyers
Eighth convocation members of the Verkhovna Rada
Self Reliance (political party) politicians
21st-century Ukrainian politicians
21st-century Ukrainian women politicians
21st-century women lawyers
Women members of the Verkhovna Rada